Southern Cross railway station is located on the Eastern Goldfields Railway in Western Australia. It serves the town of Southern Cross.

History
Southern Cross opened as the original terminus of Eastern Goldfields Railway on 1 July 1894. In 1896, the line was extended east to Coolgardie. It became a junction station when a line to Wyalkatchem opened.

When a new standard gauge Eastern Goldfields Railway was built, it bypassed the town. The old narrow gauge line closed in the mid 1970s and the old station was closed and demolished. A new station opened on the standard gauge line on 1 May 1967. To the west of the station lies a yard to serve a grain silo.

Services
The Prospector service, which runs each way between East Perth and Kalgoorlie once or twice each day, stops at Southern Cross.

The Indian Pacific also passes here, running once or twice a week (depending on the time of year) each way between East Perth and Sydney Central, but does not stop at the station.

References

Railway stations in Western Australia
Railway stations in Australia opened in 1894
Railway stations in Australia opened in 1967